The Andre Norton Nebula Award for Middle Grade and Young Adult Fiction (formerly the Andre Norton Award for Young Adult Science Fiction and Fantasy) is an annual award presented by the Science Fiction and Fantasy Writers of America (SFWA) to the author of the best young adult or middle grade science fiction or fantasy book published in the United States in the preceding year. It is named to honor prolific science fiction and fantasy author Andre Norton (1912–2005), and it was established by then SFWA president Catherine Asaro and the SFWA Young Adult Fiction committee and announced on February 20, 2005. Any published young adult or middle grade science fiction or fantasy novel is eligible for the prize, including graphic novels. There is no limit on word count. The award was originally not a Nebula Award, despite being presented along with them and following the same rules for nominations and voting, but in 2019 SFWA announced that the award was considered a Nebula category.

Andre Norton Award nominees and winners are chosen by members of SFWA, though the authors of the nominees do not need to be members. Works are nominated each year by members in a period around December 15 through January 31, and the six works that receive the most nominations then form the final ballot, with additional nominees possible in the case of ties. Soon after, members are given a month to vote on the ballot, and the final results are presented at the Nebula Awards ceremony in May. Authors are not permitted to nominate their own works, and ties in the final vote are broken, if possible, by the number of nominations the works received. Beginning with the 2009 awards, the rules were changed to the current format. Prior to then, the eligibility period for nominations was defined as one year after the publication date of the work, which allowed works to be nominated in the calendar year after their publication and then be awarded in the calendar year after that. Works were added to a preliminary list for the year if they had ten or more nominations, which were then voted on to create a final ballot, to which the SFWA organizing panel was also allowed to add an additional work.

During the 18 nomination years, 93 authors have had works nominated, of which 16 have won. Fran Wilde is the only author to win twice, out of two nominations. Holly Black and Scott Westerfeld have had the most nominations at four—with Black winning once and Westerfeld yet to win—followed by Sarah Beth Durst and Jenn Reese with three nominations each without winning. Black, Alaya Dawn Johnson, Delia Sherman, and Ysabeau S. Wilce are the only authors besides Wilde nominated multiple times to have won the award, with one win apiece out of four, two, two, and two nominations, respectively.

Winners and nominees 
In the following table, the years correspond to the date of the ceremony, rather than when the novel was first published. Each year links to the corresponding "year in literature". Entries with a blue background and an asterisk (*) next to the writer's name have won the award; those with a white background are the other nominees on the shortlist.

  *   Winners

See also
 Lodestar Award

References

2005 establishments in the United States
American children's literary awards
American speculative fiction awards
Awards established in 2005
English-language literary awards
Fantasy awards
Science fiction awards